Mammea papyracea is a species of flowering plant in the Calophyllaceae family. It is found only in Papua New Guinea.

References

papyracea
Endemic flora of Papua New Guinea
Vulnerable plants
Taxonomy articles created by Polbot